8992 Magnanimity, provisional designation , is a stony asteroid from the inner regions of the asteroid belt, approximately 6 kilometers in diameter.

The asteroid was discovered on 14 October 1980, by a team of astronomers at the Purple Mountain Observatory in Nanking, China. It was named in response to the September 11 attacks.

Orbit and classification 

Magnanimity orbits the Sun in the inner main-belt at a distance of 1.9–2.9 AU once every 3 years and 8 months (1,350 days). Its orbit has an eccentricity of 0.21 and an inclination of 8° with respect to the ecliptic.

Physical characteristics 

The Collaborative Asteroid Lightcurve Link assumes a standard albedo for stony asteroids of 0.20 and calculates a diameter of 6.2 kilometers. A rotational lightcurve of Magnanimity was obtained from photometric observations by Czech astronomer Petr Pravec at Ondřejov Observatory in September 2013. It gave a well-defined and longer-than-average rotation period of  hours with a brightness variation of 0.25 magnitude.

Naming 

This minor planet was named Magnanimity in response to the September 11 attacks. As a commemorative gesture, the IAU's Committee for the Nomenclature of Small Bodies chose three objects discovered from observatories on different continents and christened them with names representing some of the most basic and universal human values. The other two selections were 8990 Compassion (discovered from Europe) and 8991 Solidarity (discovered from South America). The approved naming citation was published by the Minor Planet Center on 2 October 2001.

Notes

References

External links 
 Asteroid Lightcurve Database (LCDB), query form (info )
 Dictionary of Minor Planet Names, Google books
 Asteroids and comets rotation curves, CdR – Observatoire de Genève, Raoul Behrend
 Discovery Circumstances: Numbered Minor Planets (5001)-(10000) – Minor Planet Center
 
 

008992
008992
Named minor planets
19801014